Ura River is a river in Estonia in Pärnu County. The river is 58.4 km long and basin size is 186 km2. It runs into Baltic Sea.

Trouts and Thymallus thymallus also live in the river.

References

Rivers of Estonia
Pärnu County